Caribou Mine may refer to:

Caribou zinc mine, a zinc mine in New Brunswick, Canada.
Caribou Mines, Nova Scotia, a gold mining district in Nova Scotia, Canada.
Caribou silver mine, a silver mine in Colorado, USA.